Jean-Baptiste Glaire (1 April 1798 – 25 February 1879) was a French Catholic priest, Hebraist, and Biblical scholar.

Biography
Glaire was born at Bordeaux.  Having completed a course of serious study at Bordeaux, he went to the seminary of Saint-Sulpice at Paris, the courses of which he followed simultaneously with those of Oriental languages at the Sorbonne. After his ordination to priesthood, in 1822, he began to teach Hebrew at the seminary of Saint-Sulpice.

In 1825 Glaire was made assistant to the Abbé Chaunac de Lanzac, professor of Hebrew at the Sorbonne, and succeeded him as lecturer in 1831. He was professor of Sacred Scripture in 1836, became dean of the faculty in 1841, and retired in 1851.  He died at Issy, near Paris.

Works
His numerous works are out of print, and largely obsolete.

The following are his chief publications.— On Oriental languages: 
 Lexicon manuale hebraicum et chaldaicum, Paris, 1830 (correction of the Lexicon of Gesenius); 
 Principes de grammaire hébraïque et chaldaïque, Paris, 1832 and 1843; 
 Manuel de l'hébraïsant, Paris, 1850; 
 Principes de grammaire arabe, Paris, 1861. On Holy Scripture: 
 Introduction historique et critique aux livres de l'Ancien et du Nouveau Testament, Paris, 1836, several times re-edited; he summarized it in his Abrégé d'introduction etc., Paris, 1846, which also went through several editions; 
 Les Livres saints vengés, ou la vérité historique et divine de l'Ancien et du Nouveau Testament, Paris, 1845. The portion of his work which endures consists of his translations of the Bible: 
 La sainte Bible en latin et en français, Paris, 1834; 
 Torah Mosché, le Pentateuque, Hebrew text with translation and annotations; 
 La sainte Bible selon la Vulgate, Paris, 1871-1873, an exact but too literal version; the translation of the New Testament, also frequently published separately, was specially examined and approved at Rome. Glaire's translation was inserted in the Bible polyglotte of Fulcran Vigouroux, Paris, 1889-1890. With Viscount Walsh, Glaire edited the 
 Encyclopédie catholique (Paris, 1854—), to which he contributed a number of articles.

References

Attribution

External links
 La Sainte Bible selon la Vulgate traduite en français, avec des notes – by Vigouroux, F. (Fulcran), 1837-1915; Glaire, J.-B. (Jean-Baptiste), 1798-1879. trl; Massachusetts Bible Society

1798 births
1879 deaths
Writers from Bordeaux
French biblical scholars
Clergy from Bordeaux
University of Paris alumni
Seminary of Saint-Sulpice (France) alumni